The Lauredian Union (UL) is a localist conservative political party in Sant Julià de Lòria, Andorra.

History
The party first contested national elections in 1997, when it was one of several local parties to form an alliance with the Liberal Union in the parliamentary elections that year. The UL failed to win a seat, but in the 2001 elections won two seats. The party did not contest the 2005 elections,

For the 2009 elections the party was part of the Reformist Coalition, which won 11 of the 28 seats. In the 2011 elections the party won two seats, supporting Democrats for Andorra. For the 2019 election, the party formed a 'third way' coalition alongside the Third Way party and several Independents. The coalition won 4 seats and 1853 votes.

References

Political parties in Andorra
Conservative parties in Europe